William George Wyatt (born 27 July 1938) is an Australian former basketball player. He competed in the men's tournament at the 1964 Summer Olympics and the 1972 Summer Olympics.

References

1938 births
Living people
Australian men's basketball players
Olympic basketball players of Australia
Basketball players at the 1964 Summer Olympics
Basketball players at the 1972 Summer Olympics
Place of birth missing (living people)